Lowe Peak is a peak rising to ,  south west of Mount Kolp, at the north west end of the Nash Range in Antarctica. It was named in honor of Peter Allan Lowe, a member of the 1961 Cape Hallett winter-over team, working as a technician on the geomagnetic project.

References

Mountains of the Ross Dependency
Shackleton Coast